Pasadena School District may refer to:
 Pasadena Unified School District (California)
 Pasadena Independent School District (Texas)